= Saudi Arabia national football team results =

Below are the all-time results of the Saudi Arabian national football team:

== Saudi Arabia national football team head to head ==
Key
Positive balance (more Wins)
Neutral balance (Wins = Losses)
Negative balance (more Losses)

Last match updated was against Qatar on 3 October 2026.

Flag	Nationality	From	To	Pld	W	D	L	%	GF	GA	GD
(Algeria)	Algeria	2025	2025	1	0	0	1	0%	0	2	-2
(Albania)	Albania	2022	2022	1	0	1	0	0%	1	1	0
(Cape Verde)	Cape Verde	2026	2026	1	0	1	0	0%	0	0	0
(Croatia)	Croatia	2022	2022	1	0	0	1	0%	0	1	-1
(Comoros)	Comoros	2025	2025	1	1	0	0	100%	3	1	+2
(Germany)	Germany	1998	2018	3	0	0	3	0%	1	13	-12
(Haiti)	Haiti	2025	2025	1	1	0	0	100%	1	0	+1
(North Macedonia)	North Macedonia	2022	2025	2	2	0	0	100%	3	1	+2
(Jordan)	Jordan	1957	2025	20	8	3	9	42.11%	22	20	+2
(Kuwait)	Kuwait	1961	2026	47	18	13	16	38.3%	54	51	+3
(Palestine)	Palestine	1976	2025	13	8	5	0	58.33%	25	8	+17
(Serbia)	Serbia	2026	2026	1	0	0	1	0%	1	2	–1
(Syria)	Syria	1957	2011	28	17	9	2	60.71%	53	22	+31
(Tajikistan)	Tajikistan	2024	2024	2	1	1	0	50%	2	1	+1
(Lebanon)	Lebanon	1957	2024	10	6	3	1	60%	17	12	+5
(Iraq)	Iraq	1975	2026	42	12	12	18	28.57%	36	56	−20
(Yemen)	Yemen	1996	2022	19	17	2	0	89.47%	56	5	+51
(Oman)	Oman	1976	2026	29	22	4	3	75.86%	55	16	+39
(Bahrain)	Bahrain	1970	2025	42	23	12	7	54.76%	65	31	+34
(Qatar)	Qatar	1970	2026	43	18	17	8	41.86%	54	31	+23
(United Arab Emirates)	United Arab Emirates	1972	2019	36	20	8	8	55.56%	51	27	+24
(Egypt)	Egypt	1961	2026	9	2	1	6	22.22%	9	31	-22
(Iran)	Iran	1977	2012	14	4	5	5	28.57%	13	19	-6
(Brazil)	Brazil	1975	2018	5	0	0	5	0%	3	18	-15
(Argentina)	Argentina	1975	2022	5	1	2	2	20%	5	8	-3
(Sudan)	Sudan	1998	1998	1	1	0	0	100%	2	1	+1
(Libya)	Libya	1975	2007	3	0	0	3	0%	2	9	-7
(Equatorial Guinea)	Equatorial Guinea		2019	1	1	0	0	100%	3	2	+1
(Turkey)	Turkey	1969	2006	3	0	0	3	0%	1	6	-5
(Iceland)	Iceland	2022	2022	1	1	0	0	100%	1	0	+1
(Mexico)	Mexico	1975	2025	7	0	1	6	0%	3	18	-15
(Russia)	Russia	1993	2018	2	1	0	1	50%	4	7	-3
(Hong Kong)	Hong Kong	2024	2024	43	19	16	8	44.19%	56	31	+25
(Japan)	Japan	1990	2025	18	5	2	11	27.78%	13	27	-14
(Kyrgyzstan)	Kyrgyzstan	2024	2024	1	1	0	0	100%	2	0	+2
(North Korea)	North Korea		2019	1	1	0	0	100%	4	0	+4
(South Korea)	South Korea	1980	2026	20	6	9	5	31.58%	21	21	0
(Australia)	Australia	1988	2025	12	2	4	6	16.67%	12	20	-8
(Morocco)	Morocco	1961	2025	7	3	1	3	50%	7	17	-10
(Czech Republic)	Czech Republic	2025	2025	1	0	1	0	0%	1	1	0
(Nigeria)	Nigeria	2023	2023	1	0	1	0	0%	2	2	0
(Bolivia)	Bolivia	1994	2022	4	0	2	2	0%	3	5	-2
(China)	China	1981	2025	22	10	5	7	45.45%	29	25	+4
(Bangladesh)	Bangladesh	1990	2001	5	5	0	0	100%	20	1	+19
(Mongolia)	Mongolia	2001	2001	2	2	0	0	100%	12	0	+12
(Indonesia)	Indonesia	2004	2025	9	7	1	1	77.78%	30	7	23
(Malaysia)	Malaysia	1984	2016	10	7	2	1	0%	21	8	13
(Senegal)	Senegal	2026	2026	1	0	1	0	0%	0	0	0
(India)	India	1982	2018	3	3	0	0	100%	11	1	10
(Pakistan)	Pakistan	1967	2024	6	3	2	1	50%	15	8	+7
(Spain)	Spain	2006	2026	4	0	0	4	0%	2	13	–11
(Sri Lanka)	Sri Lanka	1984	2004	3	3	0	0	100%	9	0	+9
(Thailand)	Thailand	2002	2024	17	14	2	1	82.35%	42	9	+33
(Chinese Taipei)	Chinese Taipei	1997	1997	2	2	0	0	100%	8	0	+8
(Vietnam)	Vietnam	2002	2021	4	4	0	0	100%	13	1	+12
(Poland)	Poland	1994	2022	4	0	0	4	0%	2	7	-5
(Uruguay)	Uruguay	2002	2026	4	1	2	1	25%	5	5	0
(Ivory Coast)	Ivory Coast	2025	2025	1	1	0	0	100%	1	0	+1
(Jamaica)	Jamaica	2020	2020	2	1	0	1	50%	4	2	+2
(Singapore)	Singapore	2019	2021	2	2	0	0	100%	6	0	+6
(Uzbekistan)	Uzbekistan	2019	2021	2	2	0	0	100%	6	2	+4
(Paraguay)	Paraguay	2019	2019	1	0	1	0	0%	0	0	0
(Colombia)	Colombia	2022	2022	1	0	0	1	0%	0	1	-1
(Costa Rica)	Costa Rica	2023	2023	1	0	0	1	0%	1	3	-2
(Ecuador)	Ecuador	2022	2026	3	0	2	1	0%	1	2	-1
(Honduras)	Honduras	2022	2022	1	0	1	0	0%	0	0	0
(Mali)	Mali	2023	2023	1	0	0	1	0%	1	3	-2
(Panama)	Panama	2022	2022	1	0	1	0	0%	1	1	0
(Puerto Rico)	Puerto Rico	2026	2026	1	1	0	0	100%	3	0	+3
(Trinidad and Tobago)	Trinidad and Tobago	2025	2025	1	0	1	0	0%	1	1	0
(United States)	United States	2022	2025	2	0	1	1	0%	0	1	–1
(Venezuela)	Venezuela	2022	2023	2	0	0	2	0%	1	3	–2

Notes:

- (†) Defunct national teams
